Balázs Nikolov (born 4 July 1977) is a Hungarian former football player.

Career

Debrecen
On 1 May 2012 Nikolov won the Hungarian Cup with Debrecen by beating MTK Budapest on penalty shoot-out in the 2011–12 season. This was the fifth Hungarian Cup trophy for Debrecen.

On 12 May 2012 Nikolov won the Hungarian League title with Debrecen after beating Pécs in the 28th round of the Hungarian League by 4–0 at the Oláh Gábor út Stadium which resulted the sixth Hungarian League title for the Hajdús.

International career
Nikolov is of paternal Bulgarian origin and has been capped three times for the Hungary national football team.

References

1977 births
Living people
People from Bonyhád
Hungarian people of Bulgarian descent
Hungarian footballers
Association football defenders
Hungary international footballers
Paksi FC players
Dunaújváros FC players
Debreceni VSC players
Hamarkameratene players
Győri ETO FC players
Vasas SC players
Nemzeti Bajnokság I players
Eliteserien players
Hungarian expatriate footballers
Expatriate footballers in Norway
Hungarian expatriate sportspeople in Norway
Sportspeople from Tolna County